Cernea is a Romanian surname that may refer to:

 Cornel Cernea
 Ion Cernea
 Michael M. Cernea
 Remus Cernea
 Ruth Cernea

Other 
 Acidalia cernea, the alternative name of Scopula epigypsa, a moth of the family Geometridae.

See also 
 Cerna (surname)
 Cerna (disambiguation)

Romanian-language surnames